"Big Girls Don't Cry" is a single by American country music artist Lynn Anderson. Released in July 1968, it was the first single from her album Big Girls Don't Cry. The song peaked at number 12 on the Billboard Hot Country Singles chart. It also reached number 1 on the RPM Country Tracks chart in Canada.

The song should not be confused with the 1962 Four Seasons hit of the same name.

Chart performance

References

1968 singles
Lynn Anderson songs
Songs written by Liz Anderson
1968 songs